Tamborini is an Italian surname. Notable people with the surname include:

Giuseppe Tamborini (born 1943), Italian footballer
José Tamborini (1886–1955), Argentine physician and politician

See also
Massimo Tamburini (1943–2014), Italian motorcycle designer

Italian-language surnames